Roy Clark & Joe Pass Play Hank Williams is an album by the jazz guitarist Joe Pass and the country guitarist Roy Clark that was released in 1994.

The producer Ralph Jungheim came up with the idea of putting Clark and Pass in the studio together. He first approached Clark, who readily agreed, calling Pass "my idol". Pass agreed for what turned out to be his last session.

The St. Clair label released a 10-track version in 1995 with only Clark and Hank Williams pictured on the cover. It does not include "I Can't Help It (If I'm Still in Love with You)" or "There'll Be No Teardrops Tonight".

Track listing

Personnel
 Joe Pass – guitar
 Roy Clark – guitar
 John Pisano – guitar
 Jim Hughart – double bass
 Colin Bailey – drums

Production
 Ralph Jungheim – producer
 Don Mooney – engineer
 James Mooney – engineer
 Bill Lightner – digital editing, mastering
 Kirk Silsbee – liner notes

References

External links
YouTube video of sessions

1994 albums
Roy Clark albums
Joe Pass albums
Hank Williams tribute albums
Collaborative albums